Brigitte Roesen (born 18 January 1944) is a German female former track and field athlete who competed for West Germany in the long jump. She also competed at the 1971 European Athletics Indoor Championships, but did not win a medal.

International competitions

See also
List of European Athletics Indoor Championships medalists (women)

References

Living people
1944 births
West German female long jumpers
German female long jumpers